Forgaria nel Friuli (locally ) is a comune (municipality) in the Province of Udine in the Italian region Friuli-Venezia Giulia, located about  northwest of Trieste and about  northwest of Udine.

Forgaria nel Friuli borders the following municipalities: Majano, Osoppo, Pinzano al Tagliamento, Ragogna, San Daniele del Friuli, Trasaghis, Vito d'Asio.

Demographic evolution

References

External links
 www.comune.forgarianelfriuli.ud.it

Cities and towns in Friuli-Venezia Giulia